Luigi Omodei may refer to one of two Italian cardinals:
Luigi Omodei (1607–1685)
Luigi Omodei (1657–1706), nephew of the former

See also
Omodei (surname)